Rothus is a genus of nursery web spiders that was first described by Eugène Louis Simon in 1898.  it contains only three species, found only in Africa and Israel: R. aethiopicus, R. auratus, and R. vittatus.

See also
 List of Pisauridae species

References

Araneomorphae genera
Pisauridae
Spiders of Africa
Spiders of Asia